Elizabeth is a borough in Allegheny County, Pennsylvania, United States, on the east bank of the Monongahela River, where Pennsylvania Route 51 crosses,  upstream (south) of Pittsburgh and close to the county line. The population was 1,398 at the 2020 census. The borough of Elizabeth is entirely contained within the 15037 USPS ZIP code. The local school district is the Elizabeth Forward School District.  The borough is home to neighborhoods Walker Heights and Town Hill.  Elizabeth Borough is the birthplace of Town Hill Hockey established in 1978.

Geography
Elizabeth is located at  (40.271189, -79.886347).

Surrounding neighborhoods
Elizabeth has two land borders with the townships of Elizabeth to the east and northeast, and Forward to the south and southeast.  Across the Monongahela River, Elizabeth runs adjacent with West Elizabeth and Jefferson Hills, the former with a direct connector via Malady Bridge.

Demographics

As of the census of 2000, there were 1,609 people, 681 households, and 422 families residing in the borough. The population density was 4,544.8 people per square mile (1,775.0/km2). There were 758 housing units at an average density of 2,141.1 per square mile (836.2/km2). The racial makeup of the borough was 94.84% White, 3.60% African American, 0.37% Native American, 0.19% Asian, and 0.99% from two or more races. Hispanic or Latino of any race were 0.25% of the population.

Households: There were 681 households, out of which 26.9% had children under the age of 18 living with them, 44.6% were married couples living together, 11.9% had a female householder with no husband present, and 37.9% were non-families. 33.0% of all households were made up of individuals, and 17.8% had someone living alone who was 65 years or older. The average household size was 2.34 and the average family size was 2.98.

Age Distribution: The population was spread out, with 22.9% under the age of 18, 6.5% from 18 to 24, 28.5% from 25 to 44, 21.0% from 45 to 64, and 21.1% who were 65 or older. The median age was 40. For every 100 females, there were 82.2 males; for every 100 females age 18 and over, there were 79.1 males.

Income: The median income for a household in the borough was $30,556, and the median income for a family was $36,607. Males had a median income of $28,088 versus $22,350 for females. The per capita income for the borough was $17,618. About 7.3% of families and 10.2% of the population were below the poverty line, including 17.5% of those under age 18 and 8.8% of those age 65 or over.

Government and politics
Mayor: Barry Boucher

History 

 1787 - Elizabeth (formerly Elizabeth Town) was founded by Samuel Mackay, Colonel Stephen Bayard and his wife Elizabeth Mackay Bayard (for whom the town was named).
 1788 - Elizabeth was one of the first seven townships organized by Allegheny County; the others being Moon, St. Clair, Mifflin, Versailles, Plum, and Pitt. The original Elizabeth Township comprised the entire triangle of land between the Monongahela and Youghiogheny Rivers. In addition to present-day Elizabeth Borough and Elizabeth Township, this also included areas which are now Forward Township, Lincoln Borough, Port Vue Borough, Liberty Borough, the City of Glassport, and the Tenth Ward of the City of McKeesport.
 1803 - The keelboat used for the first stages of the Lewis and Clark Expedition was built in Elizabeth. (This claim is disputed by the city of Pittsburgh, which makes a similar claim. See references below.)
 1834 - On April 2, 1834, a charter was issued to incorporate the Town of Elizabeth as a borough.
 1869 - Forward Township and Lincoln Township were separated from Elizabeth Township.

Early industry 
Among the earliest industries of Elizabeth were glass making, safe making, steamboat building, and ship building. Steamboats were built and repaired at O'Neil & Company from as early as 1895, and the Elizabeth Marine Ways operated between at least 1898 to 1925. The town had two coal inclines in 1876, the O'Neil and Company Coal Incline on pool 1, and the Lobb's Run Incline on pool 2.

Nike missile site
From 1956 to 1963, Elizabeth was the location of a Nike anti-aircraft missile site.

Churches 
Allen Chapel A.M.E. Church
Bethesda United Presbyterian Church Of Elizabeth
Elizabeth Baptist Church
Elizabeth United Methodist Church
Elizabeth Wesleyan Church
First Presbyterian Church Of Elizabeth – founded 1851

Old Graveyard
The Oldest Cemetery, known as "The Old Graveyard", is located on Bayard Street in Elizabeth. The cemetery contains the remains of Elizabeth Mackay Bayard, for whom the town is named. The cemetery has its first burial dating to 1774.

References

Further reading

External links
 
 Lewis and Clark timeline from the United States National Park Service

Populated places established in 1787
Pittsburgh metropolitan area
Boroughs in Allegheny County, Pennsylvania
Pennsylvania populated places on the Monongahela River
1787 establishments in Pennsylvania